Ronald King (1909–1988) was a New Zealand rugby player.

Ronald or Ron King may also refer to:

Dick King-Smith (Ronald Gordon King-Smith, 1922–2011), English author of children's books
Ron King (basketball) (born 1951), American basketball player
Ron King (born 1956), Barbadian chequers player
Ronald Stacey King (born 1967), American basketball player